William McClymont (born 13 October 1953) is a Scottish former footballer who played as a winger for Cumbernauld United, Motherwell, Stranraer and Preston Makedonia.

References

1953 births
Living people
Association football wingers
Scottish footballers
Motherwell F.C. players
Stranraer F.C. players
Scottish Football League players
Cumbernauld United F.C. players